The 2001–02 Toto Cup Al was the 18th season of the third most important football tournament in Israel since its introduction. This was the 3rd edition to be played with clubs of both Israeli Permier League and Liga Leumit clubs.

The competition began on 3 August 2001 and ended on 14 May 2002, with Hapoel Tel Aviv beating F.C. Ashdod 4–2 in the final.

Results

First round

|}

Second round

|}

Quarter-finals

Semifinals

Final

See also
 2001–02 Toto Cup Artzit

Notes

References

External links
 Israel Cups 2001/02 RSSSF
 2001-2002 Season Israeli Football 
 Toto Cup 01-02 One.co.il 

Al
Toto Cup Al
Toto Cup Al